Ilia Maissuradze (born Tbilisi, 31 July 1977) is a Georgian former rugby union player and current coach. He played as a centre and as flanker. He is an assistant coach of The Black Lion.

He played for Stade Nantais, in France and RK Heusenstamm in Germany.

He had 18 caps for Georgia, from 1997 to 2007, scoring 1 try, 5 points on aggregate. He was called for the 2007 Rugby World Cup, playing in two games but remaining scoreless.

References

External links
Ilia Maissuradze International Statistics

1977 births
Living people
Rugby union players from Georgia (country)
Rugby union centres
Rugby union flankers
Georgia international rugby union players
Rugby union players from Tbilisi